The 2020–21 season was Bengaluru FC's eighth season as a club since its establishment in 2013.

Background

Transfers
During the course of 2019–20 season, Bengaluru FC extended contracts of Juanan, Thongkhosiem Haokip and Edmund Lalrindika.
At the end of the season, Bengaluru FC extended contracts of Udanta Singh, Erik Paartalu, Dimas Delgado, Ajay Chhetri, Leon Augustine, Roshan Singh and Namgyal Bhutia.

On 3 June Bengaluru FC announced signing of defender Pratik Chaudhari and club's former goalkeeper Lalthuammawia Ralte. Both the players signed with the club for two seasons. On 5 June Bengaluru FC announced signing of defenders Joe Zoherliana and Wungngayam Muirang on two year deal. On 20 June Bengaluru FC announced signing of Brazilian forward Cleiton Silva on one year deal. In August 2020, Bengaluru signed left back Ajith Kumar from Chennai City F.C. on a three-year deal for an undisclosed fee. On 18 September Bengaluru FC signed midfielder Huidrom Thoi Singh from Reliance Foundation Young Champs. On 3 October Bengaluru FC announced signing of goalkeeper Lara Sharma for three years. On 20 October Bengaluru FC announced signing of Spanish defender Fran González and Norwegian striker Kristian Opseth on season long deals.

Bengaluru FC did not renew the contract of Spanish midfielder Nili as he joined Greek side Levadiakos. Jamaican striker Kevaughn Frater signed for Israeli club Maccabi Netanya. Defender Nishu Kumar and goalkeeper Prabhsukhan Singh Gill signed for Kerala Blasters. On 13 September 2020, Spanish striker Manuel Onwu completed the move to Odisha FC after being on the loan the previous season. Defender Gursimrat Singh Gill signed for Bengaluru United Brazilian midfielder Raphael Augusto's contract with the club was terminated on mutual agreement, owing to personal reasons. Bengaluru FC did not renew the contract of Spanish defender Albert Serrán Defender Sairuat Kima joined Sudeva FC. Midfielder Eugeneson Lyngdoh and defender Rino Anto joined East Bengal.

In the winter transfer window, Ajay Chhetri was loaned out to SC East Bengal till the end of the season.

In

Out

Out on loan

Pre-season and friendlies
Bengaluru FC started pre-season with a friendly against Hyderabad FC on 7 November 2020 at Dempo SC ground, in Goa. Bengaluru drew the game 1–1 with Wungngayam Muirang scoring the opening goal in first half. Aridane Santana scored from spot to equalise for Hyderabad in second half.

Mid-season friendlies

Competitions

Indian Super League

League table

Results by matchday

Matches

AFC Cup

ATK, who finished runners-up in the league phase of the 2019–20 Indian Super League season, merged with 2019–20 I-League champions Mohun Bagan and qualified automatically to the AFC Cup group stage. Third-placed team in 2019–20 Indian Super League season, Bengaluru FC qualified for 2021 AFC Cup qualifiers. This will be Bengaluru's sixth appearance in the tournament.

Qualifying play-offs

 
Preliminary round 2

Play-off round
Due to the lockdown and travel restrictions in Bangladesh, the AFC Sub-Committee decided that Abahani Limited Dhaka are considered to have withdrawn from the AFC Cup 2021 and awarded the Playoff Stage slot to Eagles FC. Playoff Stage match supposed to be hosted by Bengaluru FC, moved to Maldives, which is hosting  Group D matches, where the winner of Playoff will be placed. Due to the COVID-19 pandemic Play-off round between Bengaluru FC and Eagles FC scheduled for May 2021 postponed to 15 August 2021.

Coaching Staff

Management

After poor outings during the ongoing season, on 6 January 2021, it was announced that Carles Cuadrat and Bengaluru FC decided to mutually part ways. Naushad Moosa, the assistant coach and the head coach of Bengaluru FC B, was appointed as a caretaker coach. Soon after the departure of Carles, the fitness coach Mikel Guillen too parted ways with the club.

As of 26 February 2021

Player statistics

Appearances and goals

|-
! colspan=12 style=background:#2545A0;color:white; text-align:center| Goalkeepers

|-
! colspan=12 style=background:#2545A0;color:white; text-align:center| Defenders
|-

|-
! colspan=12 style=background:#2545A0;color:white; text-align:center| Midfielders
|-

|-
! colspan=12 style=background:#2545A0;color:white;  text-align:center| Forwards
|-

|-
! colspan=12 style=background:#2545A0;color:white; text-align:center| Players transferred out during the season 
|-

Updated: 14 April 2021

Goal scorers

Source: soccerway
Updated: 14 April 2021

Clean sheets

Source: soccerway
Updated: 14 April 2021

Disciplinary record

Source: soccerway
Updated: 14 April 2021

References

Notes

See also
 2020–21 in Indian football

Bengaluru FC seasons
2020s in Bangalore
Bengaluru